Per Nørgård (born 13 July 1932) is a Danish composer and music theorist. Though his style has varied considerably throughout his career, his music has often included repeatedly evolving melodies—such as the infinity series—in the vein of Jean Sibelius, and a perspicuous focus on lyricism. Reflecting on this, the composer Julian Anderson described his style as "one of the most personal in contemporary music". Nørgård has received several awards, including the 2016 Ernst von Siemens Music Prize.

Life and career
Per Nørgård was born in Gentofte, Denmark in 1932. He studied with Vagn Holmboe privately at age 17, and then formally at Royal Danish Academy of Music, Copenhagen, with Holmboe, Harald Høffding and Herman David Koppel. From 1956 to 1957, he subsequently studied in Paris with Nadia Boulanger, who had taught many leading composers of the time. Nørgård soon gained his own teaching positions, first at the Odense Conservatory in 1958, and then at the Royal Danish Conservatory of Music in 1960. His students at the latter included the composer Carl Davis. Between 1958 and 1962, Nørgård had a stint as a music critic for the newspaper Politiken. He left these positions to teach composition at the Royal Academy of Music, Aarhus/Aalborg in 1965. Here he taught many composers who would go on to have major careers, including Hans Abrahamsen, Hans Gefors, Karl Aage Rasmussen, Bent Sørensen,

To begin with, he was strongly influenced by the Nordic styles of Jean Sibelius, Carl Nielsen and Vagn Holmboe. In the 1960s, Nørgård began exploring the modernist techniques of central Europe, eventually developing a serial compositional system based on the "infinity series", which he used in his Voyage into the Golden Screen, the Second and Third Symphonies, I Ching, and other works of the late 1960s and 70s. Later he became interested in the Swiss artist Adolf Wölfli, who inspired many of Nørgård's works, including the Fourth Symphony, the opera Det Guddommelige Tivoli and Papalagi for solo guitar.

Nørgård has composed works in all major genres: six operas, two ballets, eight symphonies and other pieces for orchestra, several concertos, choral and vocal works, a very large number of chamber works (among them ten string quartets) and several solo instrumental works. These include a number of works for the guitar, mostly written for the Danish guitarist Erling Møldrup: In Memory Of... (1978), Papalagi (1981), a series of suites called Tales from a Hand (1985–2001), Early Morn (1997–98) and Rondino Amorino (1999). One of his most important works for percussion solo is I Ching (1982) for the Danish percussionist Gert Mortensen. He has also composed music for several films, including The Red Cloak (1966), Babette's Feast (1987), and Hamlet, Prince of Denmark (1993).

His eighth symphony was premiered on 19 September 2012 in the Helsinki Music Centre, Finland, by the Helsinki Philharmonic Orchestra conducted by John Storgårds. Heikki Valska from the Finnish radio described the symphony as "very bright and lyrical" and "approachable". It was well received by the audience at the premiere.  It was later recorded by the Vienna Philharmonic Orchestra conducted by Sakari Oramo.

Nørgård is also a prolific writer. He has written many articles dealing with music not only from a technical but also a philosophical viewpoint.

Music 

Nørgård's music often features the use of the infinity series (Danish Uendelighedsrækken) for serializing melody, harmony, and rhythm in musical composition. The method takes its name from the endlessly self-similar nature of the resulting musical material, comparable to fractal geometry. Mathematically, the infinity series is an integer sequence. "Invented in an attempt to unify in a perfect way repetition and variation," the first few terms of its simplest form are 0, 1, −1, 2, 1, 0, 0, 1, −2, 3, ….

Nørgård discovered the melodic infinity series in 1959 and it proved an inspiration for many of his works during the 1960s. However, it was not until his Voyage into the Golden Screen for small ensemble (1968)—which has been identified as the first "properly instrumental piece of spectral composition" —and Symphony No. 2 (1970) that it provided the structure for an entire work. The harmonic and rhythmic infinity series were developed in the early 1970s and the three series were first integrated in Nørgård's Symphony No. 3.

Selected list of works

Operas 
 Labyrinten (The Labyrinth) (1963)
 Gilgamesh (1972) 
 Siddharta (1974–79)
 Der göttliche Tivoli (The Divine Circus) (1983)
 Orfeus: Den uendelige sang (Orpheus: The Endless Song) (1988)
 Nuit des Hommes (1996)

Orchestral 
Symphonies
 Symphony No. 1 Sinfonia austera (1953–55)
 Symphony No. 2 (1970)
 Symphony No. 3 (1972–75), a choral symphony
 Symphony No. 4 Indian Rose Garden and Chinese Witch's Lake (1981)
 Symphony No. 5 (1987-90)
 Symphony No. 6 At the End of the Day (1999)
 Symphony No. 7 (2004-06)
 Symphony No. 8 (2010-11)
 Metamorfosi (1954), for strings
 Constellations (1958), for strings
 Iris (1966)
 Luna (1967)
 Voyage into the Golden Screen (1968)
 Dream Play (1975)
 Twilight (1977)
 Burn (1984)
 Spaces of Time (1991), for orchestra with piano
 Night-Symphonies, Day Breaks (1992), for chamber orchestra
 Aspects of Leaving (1997)
 Terrains Vagues (2000–2001)

Concertante 
 Violin
 Violin Concerto No. 1 Helle Nacht (1986–87)
 Violin Concerto No. 2 Borderlines (2002)
 Cello
 Cello Concerto No. 1 Between (1985)
 Cello Concerto No. 2 Momentum (2009)
 Cantica Concertante (2012), for cello and ensemble
 Harp
 Harp Concertino No. 1 King, Queen and Ace (1988), for harp and 13 instruments
 Harp Concertino No. 2 Through Thorns (2003), for harp, flute, clarinet and string quartet
 Percussion
 Percussion Concerto No. 1 For a Change (1983)
 Percussion Concerto No. 2 Bach to the Future (1997), for two percussionists and orchestra
 Accordion Concerto Recall (1968)
 Viola Concerto Remembering Child (1986)
 Piano Concerto Concerto in due tempi (1994–95)
 Three Nocturnal Movements (2019), for violin, cello and ensemble

Chamber/Instrumental 
 String Quartets
 String Quartet No. 1
 String Quartet No. 2 Quartetto Brioso (1958)
 String Quartet No. 3
 String Quartet No. 4 Quartet in 3 Spheres (1969), for string quartet with tape
 String Quartet No. 5 Inscape (1969)
 String Quartet No. 6 Tintinnabulary (1986)
 String Quartet No. 7 (1994)
 String Quartet No. 8 Night Descending like Smoke (1997)
 String Quartet No. 9 Into the Source (2001)
 String Quartet No. 10 Harvest Timeless (2005)
 Flute Quintet (1953), for flute, violin, viola, cello and piano
 Solo Intimo (1953), for cello
 Clarinet Trio No. 1 (1955), for clarinet, cello and piano
 Whirl's World (1970), for wind quintet
 Arcana (1970), for percussion, electric guitar and accordion
 Clarinet Trio No. 2 Spell (1973), for clarinet, cello and piano
 Cantica (1977), for cello and piano
 Proteus (1980), for flute and percussion
 Sonora (1981), for flute and harp
 I Ching (1982), for solo percussion
 Clarinet Trio No. 3 Lin (1986), for clarinet, cello and piano
 Syn (Vision) (1988), for brass quintet
 Strings (1992), for string trio
 Scintillation (1993), for septet of flute, clarinet, horn, violin, viola, cello and piano
 Roads to Ixtlan (1993), for 4 saxophones
 Wild Swans (1994), for 4 saxophones
 Dancers Around Jupiter (1995), for 4 saxophones
 Winter Music (1998), for flute, clarinet, percussion, organ, guitar and cello
 It's All His Fancy That (2003), for trumpet, trombone and piano
 Delta (2005), for saxophone, cello and piano
 Trio Breve (2012), for piano trio

Piano/Keyboard 
 Piano Sonata No. 1 (1953)
 Piano Sonata No. 2 (1957)
 Partita Concertante (1958), for organ
 Grooving (1968), for piano
 Canon (1971), for organ
 Turn (1973), for piano
 Trepartita (1988), for organ
 Remembering (1989), for piano
 Gemini Rising (1990), for harpsichord
 Waterways (2008), for piano

Vocal/Choral
 The Dommen (Judgement), for vocalists, choir, children's choir and orchestra
 Libra (1973), for tenor, choir, guitar and two vibraphones
 Singe die Gärten (1974), for choir and 8 instruments
 Nova genitura (1975), for soprano and ensemble
 Fons Laetitiae (1975), for soprano and harp
 Winter Cantata (1976), for soprano, choir, organ and optional ensemble
 Frostsalme (1976), for 16-part choir
 Cycle (1977), for 12-part choir
 Seadrift (1978), for soprano and ensemble
 Wie ein Kind (Like a Child), for choir (1979–80)
 And Time Shall Be No More, for choir (1994)
 Ut rosa (2000), for choir
 Mytisk Morgen (2000), for choir and bass clarinet

Writings
  
  Translated by L. K. Christensen. Numus-West 2, no. 2: 4–16

Awards 
 Lili Boulanger Prize (1957)
 Nordic Council Music Prize (1974) for his opera Gilgamesh
 Léonie Sonning Music Prize (1996; Denmark)
 Wihuri Sibelius Prize (2006)
 Marie-Josée Kravis Prize for New Music (2014)
 Ernst von Siemens Music Prize (2016)

References

Sources

Further reading

External links 
The infinity series – composer's website 
 
Per Nørgård kompositioner @ www.kb.dk (Danish)

1932 births
20th-century classical composers
21st-century classical composers
Twelve-tone and serial composers
Composers for the classical guitar
Danish opera composers
Male opera composers
Danish classical composers
Danish male classical composers
Living people
Royal Danish Academy of Music alumni
Gaudeamus Composition Competition prize-winners
Pupils of Vagn Holmboe
Ernst von Siemens Music Prize winners
People from Gentofte Municipality
20th-century male musicians
21st-century male musicians